The president of the Southern Baptist Convention heads the convention and is elected at the Annual Meeting. The president's duties include presiding over the annual meeting; appointing members to SBC committees; serving as an ex officio member of the board of SBC entities including the International Mission Board, the North American Mission Board, and Lifeway Christian Resources; and representing the SBC to other Baptist denominations and to the press.

Although the SBC Bylaws do not specifically state that only a male may be elected as president, no female has ever served as such (the majority of presidents have been pastors of churches, which according to the Baptist Faith and Message, the office of pastor is limited to men only).  Any person may be nominated and there is no requirement that a candidate announce his intent to run prior to the Annual Meeting (during the 2022 Annual Meeting, three candidates announced their intent to run, and a fourth candidate was nominated at the Annual Meeting).  If only one candidate is nominated, the secretary of the SBC (or any designee) may cast the ballot.  If three or more candidates are nominated, and no candidate receives a majority on the first ballot, subsequent ballots shall carry all candidates in the top 50 percent of the prior ballot.  Proxy voting is not allowed.

Under SBC Bylaws, the term is for one year, and a candidate can serve a maximum of two consecutive terms, after which he must sit out a year before standing for re-election.  Prior to the current bylaws, presidents could serve more than two terms and frequently did: P.H. Mell served a total of 16 years (over two terms spanning eight years each), the most of any president.  The service year overlaps with two calendar years as the Annual Meeting is held in June, and the term starts upon completion of the Annual Meeting (thus, at the Annual Meeting, the incumbent president serves until the Annual Meeting concludes, after which the elected president—whether incumbent or new—will begin his term).

Since the advent of the current bylaws, the custom has been for the president to serve two consecutive terms, but not run again after the one-year stand-down period; however, it is not uncommon for a president to serve only one term and then step down and not run again.  But, two persons have served as president for more than the customary two terms since that time:
Adrian Rogers served as president for a single term in 1979–1980 and then again for two consecutive terms in 1987–1988 and 1988–1989.
When the 2020 Annual Meeting was cancelled for the first time in 75 years due to the COVID-19 pandemic, incumbent President J.D. Greear's term was extended to a third year despite the normal term limit, since his replacement could not be elected until the next meeting.

See also

List of Southern Baptist Convention affiliated people

References

Southern Baptist Convention
Lists of Protestants
Bapt
Southern Baptist Convention presidents
Southern Baptists